The Society Of Camera Operators was founded in 1979 under the name Society of Operating Cameramen. Its primary mission is to advance the art, craft and creative contribution of the camera operator in the motion picture and television industries. The SOC represents camera operators, camera assistants, directors of photography as well as other related crafts. Its roster boasts of a global membership representing a large cultural diversity within the technical moviemaking crafts.

The SOC also publishes the four-times annually Operating Cameraman Magazine, founded in 1991 and renamed the Camera Operator Magazine in 2007. Written from the perspective of the camera operator, each issue deals with issues relevant to  the world-wide motion picture and TV industry. It includes articles on the development of the motion picture camera (from the silent era through modern equipment), aspect ratios, set etiquette, the digital revolution, and other informational subjects. Camera Operator magazine contains articles written by members who describe current motion pictures and television shows they have been working on—a true representation of the experiences of camera operators on the sets and on location.

The organization hosts an annual banquet, The SOC Lifetime Achievement Awards, to honor those members who have contributed and advanced the craft of the camera operator. A portion of the proceeds from this event are donated to the Eye Care Clinic Vision Center of the Children's Hospital Los Angeles.

Renamed the Society of Camera Operators, more befitting its diverse membership of both men and women. The society's motto "We See It First!" is a descriptive slogan referring to the fact that the camera operator, by personally viewing the scene through the viewfinder of a motion picture camera, physically sees the scene prior to anyone else until the screened dailies. "As camera operators we see the EXACT angles that audiences will see onscreen, and not from monitors placed around the set showing the 'representation' of what the camera operator sees and experiences." (Michael Frediani, SOC past president)

Camera Operator of the Year – Film
The Society of Camera Operators for Camera Operator of the Year – Film is an annual award given by the society to camera operators for their outstanding achievements in field of filmmaking in a given year. The award was first given out in 2008 and, aside from 2011, has presented every year since, for film achievements from the previous year.

2000s

2010s

Individuals with multiple awards

2 awards
 Scott Sakamoto
|}

Individuals with multiple nominations

6 nominations
 Stephen Campanelli
 Scott Sakamoto

5 nominations
 Colin Anderson

4 nominations
 Mitch Dubin
 Geoffrey Haley
 Peter Rosenfeld

3 nominations
 Jacques Jouffret

2 nominations
 Will Arnot
 Ian Fox
 David Luckenbach
|}

References

External links 
The SOC's Official Web site
Camera Operator Magazine
Children's Hospital
Lifetime achievement awards

Organizations established in 1979
1979 establishments in the United States
Entertainment industry societies
Cinematography organizations